Dolycoris indicus is a species of true bug in the family Pentatomidae. It is a pest of millets.

References

Pentatomidae
Insect pests of millets